Lippitt is a surname, and may refer to:

Charles W. Lippitt (1846-1924), Governor of Rhode Island
Frederick Lippitt (1917-2005), Rhode Island House minority leader
Henry Lippitt (1818-1891), Governor of Rhode Island
Henry Frederick Lippitt (1856-1933), US Senator from Rhode Island
John W. Lippitt (1822–1896), New York politician

See also
 Lippett (surname)